The national symbols of Iraq are official and unofficial flags, icons or cultural expressions that are emblematic, representative or otherwise characteristic of Iraq and of its culture.

Symbol

References 

National symbols of Iraq